Donghu Subdistrict is a subdistrict on the northwestern part of Chaoyang District, Beijing, China. It borders Wangjing Subdistrict to the south, Laiguangying Area to the north and west, and Cuigezhuang Area to the east. As of 2020, its population was 62,467.

The subdistrict got its current name Donghu due to the low-lying area on both banks of Beixiao River, where small pools and puddles will form during the rainy season.

History 
Donghu Subdistrict was established in 2014. It was made up of former parts of Laiguangying Area and Cuigezhuang Area.

Administrative Division 
As of the year 2022, there were a total of 14 communities under Donghu Subdistrict:

Transportation 

Donghu Subdistrict is currently served by two stations of Beijing Subway—Donghuqu station , located alongside Guangshun North Avenue, and Wangjingdong station , located at the intersection of Qiyang Road and Heyin East Road.

References 

Chaoyang District, Beijing
Subdistricts of Beijing